Ezorongondo is a settlement in the Epukiro Constituency in the Omaheke Region in Namibia. The village is the seat of the Ovambanderu royal house. 

The word can also refers to the city of Walvis Bay, in the Herero language.

References

Populated places in the Omaheke Region